Guard or guards may refer to:

Professional occupations
 Bodyguard, who protects an individual from personal assault
 Crossing guard, who stops traffic so pedestrians can cross the street
 Lifeguard, who rescues people from drowning
 Prison guard, who supervises prisoners in a prison or jail
 Security guard, who protects property, assets, or people
 Conductor (rail) § Train guard, in the UK, Australia, New Zealand, and India

Computing and telecommunications
 Guard (computer science), in programming language, an expression that directs program execution
 Guard (information security), a device for controlling communication between computer networks
 Guard interval, intervals in transmission, used in telecommunications
 Aircraft emergency frequency, commonly referred to as "guard"

Governmental and military

 Border guard, a state security agency
 Coast guard, responsible for coastal defence and offshore rescue
 Colour guard, a detachment of soldiers assigned to the protection of regimental colors
 Commander-in-Chief's Guard, a unit of the Continental Army that protected General George Washington
 Foot guards, a senior infantry unit in some armies, often with ceremonial duties
 Garda Síochána, Irish police force informally known as Guards
 Guard of honour, primarily ceremonial
 Guards (Russia), elite military in pre-revolutionary Russia
 Guards unit, a title earned by distinguished units in the former Soviet Union and in some contemporary ex-Soviet states
 Police in medieval contexts
 Royal Guard, military bodyguards, soldiers or armed retainers responsible for the protection of a royal person, often an elite unit of the regular armed forces.

Sports
 Guard (gridiron football), a player between the center and the tackles on the offensive line
 Guard (basketball)
 Point guard, or "playmaker"
 Shooting guard, or "off guard"
 Combo guard, combining both point and shooting guard
 Guard (grappling), a position in martial arts
 Color guard (flag spinning), people who toss flags, spin a rifle and a saber at performances with a marching band
 Winter guard, people who spin and toss flags, rifles, and/or sabers at indoor performances on a tarp

Other uses
 Guard (surname)
 Guards (band), an American rock band
 Guards (steamboat)
 Guard (weapon), part of the handle of a sword designed to stop the user's hand from slipping onto the blade
 Guard dogs, guard llamas and guard geese, animals employed to watch for unwanted or unexpected animals or people
 Abdominal guarding, in medicine, the tensing of the abdominal wall muscles to guard inflamed organs
 Mate guarding, guarding of a potential or former mate from other individuals
 Mouthguard, a protective device for the mouth
 Wächter (Anatol) (Guards), several monumental sculptures by Anatol Herzfeld

See also
 Civil Guard (disambiguation)
 The Guard (disambiguation)
 National Guard (disambiguation)
 Sentry (disambiguation)
 Sentinel (disambiguation)